Nilu Phule (Marathi pronunciation: [niɭuː pʰuleː]; 4 April 1930 - 13 July 2009) was an Indian actor known for his roles in Marathi movies and Marathi theatre. Nilu Phule acted in around 250 Marathi and Hindi movies during his film career. He was most prominently seen playing the roles of notorious villains in the movies.

Phule was also a social worker, and was associated with Rashtra Seva Dal.

Early life
Phule was born in 1930 in Pune as Nilkanth Krushnaji Phule in a [Hindu Family]. He was involved in the independence movement. According to his interview in a serial 'Vastraharan' on a Marathi Channel, he was a freedom fighter from Pune.

Phule's first job was that of a gardener at the Armed Forces Medical College, Pune, aged 17. He used to get a salary of Rs. 80 per month, out of which, he used to donate Rs. 10 to the Rashtriya Seva Dal, a social organization he was involved with. He wanted to pursue his gardening career forward, but due to lack of financial support, he could not start his own plant nursery. During this time, at the age of 20, Nilu was inspired by Rabindranath Tagore's writings and went on to write a drama, Udyan. His composing for the drama Yedya Gabalache Kam Nahi during the 1957 Lok Sabha elections garnered him fame.

Acting career
Nilu Phule began his theatrical career with the Marathi folk performances (Loknatya). His first professional drama was Katha Akalecha Kandyachi, which went on to have over 2000 shows. It was based on this success that he was offered his first movie Ek Gaav Baara Bhanagadi, by Anant Mane in 1968.

Nilu often played villains; most notably his portrayal of Sakharam Binder. Some of his notable film roles include: Hindurao Dhonde Patil, a zamindar and a sugar tycoon in Samna, a power-drunk politician in Mahesh Bhatt's Saaransh and a political journalist in Jabbar Patel's Sinhasan.

He also played the role of 'Nathu Mama' in the 1983 hit Hindi movie Coolie where he worked with Amitabh Bachchan.

One of Phule's most notable theatrical performances include his role as the eponymous hero of Vijay Tendulkar's Sakharam Binder (first staged in 1972). Kamlakar Sarang, who directed the first production of the play in 1972, was apprehensive of Phule's reticence. However, he was convinced that Phule would be fit for the role, when Vijay Tendulkar reminded him of Phule's aggressive performance as a minister in another play, Katha Aklechya Kandyachi.

He was known for his legendary voice and dialogue delivery. His dialogues in his films remains one of the most popular dialogues across Marathi Film Industry. It is said that his acting in villainous roles in movies was so surreal that women in real life would despise him thinking that he was the same deviant person in real life too, and that was a great compliment to his works.

In May 2013, when Forbes India, the Indian edition of American Business Magazine Forbes, declared 25 Greatest Acting Performances of Indian Cinema, the list included Phule's performance as Hindurao Dhonde Patil in the film Samna.

Death
Nilu Phule died on 13 July 2009, aged 79, from esophageal cancer. His wife Rajani Phule died in 2011. They are survived by their daughter Gargi Phule Thatte.

Awards
 Sangeet Natak Akademi Award (1991), by the President of India
 Maharashtra State Award for Haat lavin tithe sone (1973)
 Maharashtra State Award for Saamna (1974)
 Maharashtra State Award for Choricha Mamla (1975) 
 Jayantrao Tilak Memorial Life Time Achievement Award' given by Kesari Maratha Trust, Tilak Maharashtra Vidyapeeth and Akhil Bharatiya Marathi Natya Parishad, Pune chapter.

Plays Acted
 Katha Akalecha Kandyachi
 Sakharam Binder

Filmography

References

External links
 
 Phule's interview with DD Sahyadri

1930s births
2009 deaths
Deaths from cancer in India
Deaths from esophageal cancer
Indian male film actors
Indian male stage actors
Male actors in Marathi cinema
Male actors in Marathi theatre
Recipients of the Sangeet Natak Akademi Award